New Era or variant, may refer to:

Places 
 New Era, Indiana, an unincorporated community in the United States
 New Era, Michigan, United States, a village
 New Era, Oregon, United States, an unincorporated community
 New Era, West Virginia, United States, an unincorporated community
 New Era Park, Sacramento, California, United States, a neighborhood
 New Era, South Australia, a late-19th century village settlement where the town of Cadell is now

Arts, entertainment, and media

Newspapers 
 The New Era (newspaper), a weekly newspaper in Sweet Home, Oregon
 New Era, a newspaper in Washington, D.C., subsequently renamed to New National Era
 New Era (Namibia), state-owned newspaper of the government of Namibia
 New Era (St. Louis), the first newspaper in St. Louis, Missouri

Television 
 "A New Era" (Survivor), an episode in Survivor 41.
 "The New Era" (The O.C.), second-season T.V. episode of The O.C.

Music
 New Era (Cloudscape album), 2012 album by the Swedish metal band Cloudscape
 New Era (Kiss Daniel album), debut album of Nigerian musician Kiss Daniel
 New Era (Revolution Renaissance album), debut album of Revolution Renaissance 
 The New Era (album), 2018 album by Got7
 New Era Orchestra, a classical music orchestra from Kyiv
New Era, album by Andreas Ottensamer
 "New Era", a 2020 song by SixTones

Other 
 Downton Abbey: A New Era (film), a 2022 film, the second Downton Abbey movie
 New Era (magazine), youth magazine of The Church of Jesus Christ of Latter-day Saints
 New Era (novel), 1908 novel by Bigehuan Zhuren
 The New Era (WWE), an era in the history of American professional wrestling promotion WWE

Education 
 New Era University, in the Philippines, run by the Iglesia ni Cristo
 New Era University College, a non-profit, private university college in Malaysia
 New Era High School, Bahá'í school in Panchgani, Maharashtra, India
 New Era Academy, charter school in Baltimore, Maryland

Organizations 
 New Era (automobile company), 1901–1902, Camden, New Jersey, U.S.
 New Era Cap Company, manufacturer of headwear, based in Buffalo, New York, USA
 New Era Manufacturing Company (see Duriron Company)
 New Era Motors, producer of the Ruxton automobile, 1929–1930
 New Era Publications, a publishing arm of the Church of Scientology
 New Era Tickets, entertainment ticketing company in Wayne, Pennsylvania 
 Foundation for New Era Philanthropy, Ponzi scheme in the U.S. which collapsed in 1995

Politics 
 A New Era, Venezuelan political party
 New Era Party, a Latvian political party
 New Era (Prussia), the term for the government policy in the Kingdom of Prussia, (1858–1862)
 Xi Jinping Thought on Socialism with Chinese Characteristics for a New Era, a political theory of Chinese Communist Party

Other uses
 New Era (ship), a list of ships with the same name

See also

 New Era Building (disambiguation)
 
 ERA (disambiguation)
 New Age (disambiguation)
 A New Era of Thought, by Charles Howard Hinton, about the fourth dimension
 Coventry Automatics Aka the Specials: Dawning of a New Era, compilation album